TWA Flight 3 was a twin-engine Douglas DC-3-382 propliner, registration NC1946, operated by Transcontinental and Western Air (TWA) as a scheduled domestic passenger flight from New York, New York, to Burbank, California, in the United States, via several stopovers including Las Vegas, Nevada. All 22 people on board, including movie star Carole Lombard, her mother, and three crew members, died in the crash. The Civil Aeronautics Board (CAB) investigated the accident and determined that the cause was a navigation error by the captain.

Flight history

Transcontinental and Western Air (TWA) Flight 3 was flying a transcontinental route from New York City to Burbank, California, with multiple intermediate stops, including Indianapolis, St. Louis, Albuquerque, and Las Vegas.

On the morning of January 16, 1942, at 4:00 local time, actress Carole Lombard, her mother, and her MGM press agent boarded Flight 3 in Indianapolis. Lombard, eager to meet her husband Clark Gable in Los Angeles, was returning from a successful war bond promotion tour in the Midwest, where she helped raise over $2 million.

Upon arrival in Albuquerque, Lombard and her companions were asked to surrender their seats for the continuing flight segment to make room for fifteen United States Army Air Corps personnel flying to California. Lombard insisted that because of her war bond efforts she was also essential, and she convinced the station agent to let her group reboard the flight. Other passengers were removed instead, including violinist Joseph Szigeti. The original flight crew was replaced by a new crew at Albuquerque. A refueling stop was planned at Winslow, Arizona, because of the higher passenger load and forecast headwinds. However, in the air the new captain decided to skip the Winslow stop and to proceed directly to Las Vegas.

After a brief refueling stop at Las Vegas Airport (now Nellis Air Force Base) the plane took off on a clear, moonless night for its final leg to Burbank.

Investigation
  
The accident was investigated by the Civil Aeronautics Board (CAB). This indicated to investigators that the crew was not using radio navigation to follow the airway (defined by the low frequency range), which would have provided them safe obstacle clearance, but was instead using a compass heading. Visibility was generally good, but since most airway light beacons had been turned off because of the ongoing Second World War they were not usable, although one important beacon was operating normally.

A key piece of evidence was the flight plan form, completed by the first officer in Albuquerque (but not signed by the captain, despite a company requirement to do so). On the form, the planned outbound magnetic course from Las Vegas was listed as 218°, which is close to the flight path actually flown by the crew to the crash point. Since this course, flown at 8,000 ft, is lower than the terrain in that direction (which rises to about ), the board concluded that it was clearly an error. The board speculated that because both pilots had flown to Burbank much more frequently from Boulder City Airport than from Las Vegas, and that from Boulder City an outbound magnetic course of 218° would have been a reasonable choice to join the airway to Burbank, the crew likely inadvertently used the Boulder City outbound course instead of the appropriate Las Vegas course. Boulder City was not used as a refueling point on this trip as it had no runway lighting. To test its hypothesis, the CAB asked to review some other completed TWA flight plan forms for flights between Albuquerque and Las Vegas. The CAB members were surprised to discover a form from another flight that had also specified the same incorrect 218° outbound course from Las Vegas. TWA's chief pilot testified that the course written on that form was "obviously a mistake".

The CAB issued a final report with the following probable cause statement:
Upon the basis of the foregoing findings and of the entire record available at this time, we find that the probable cause of the accident to aircraft NC 1946 on January 16, 1942, was the failure of the captain after departure from Las Vegas to follow the proper course by making use of the navigational facilities available to him.

The CAB added the following contributing factors:
 The use of an erroneous compass course
 Blackout of most of the beacons in the neighborhood of the accident made necessary by the war emergency
 Failure of the pilot to comply with TWA's directive of July 17, 1941, issued in accordance with a suggestion from the Administrator of Civil Aeronautics requesting pilots to confine their flight movements to the actual on-course signals

Conspiracy
In the book My Lunches with Orson, Orson Welles claims that he had been told by a security agent that Flight 3 was shot down by Nazi agents who knew of the route in advance. He also claimed that news of the shooting was kept quiet to prevent vigilante action against Americans of German ancestry. This theory has been questioned by Robert Matzen in his book Fireball: Carole Lombard and the Mystery of Flight 3.

See also
List of accidents and incidents involving commercial aircraft
1949 Mexicana DC-3 crash, a 1949 DC-3 crash that killed Mexican actress Blanca Estela Pavon

Notes

References

External links

LostFlights – Aviation Archaeology site
Location of crash site – on www.birdandhike.com
Names of those aboard the aircraft via Google newspapers   (scroll down to mid-page)
Crash 75th anniversary via Las Vegas Review-Journal   (also available archived)

1942 in Nevada
Airliner accidents and incidents involving controlled flight into terrain
Accidents and incidents involving the Douglas DC-3
Airliner accidents and incidents in Nevada
Airliner accidents and incidents caused by pilot error
Aviation accidents and incidents in the United States in 1942
Events in Clark County, Nevada
January 1942 events
3